Alain Margoni (13 October 1934) is a French classical composer.

Life 
Born in Neuilly-Plaisance, Margoni studied harmony with Henri Challan, counterpoint and fugue with Noël Gallon, orchestral conducting with Louis Fourestier, musical analysis with Olivier Messiaen and Ondes Martenot with Maurice Martenot. at the Conservatoire de Paris. In the competition for the Prix de Rome in 1957 and 1958 he won a second prize each and in 1959 the Premier Grand Prix with the cantata Dans les Jardins d’Armide after Torquato Tasso's Jerusalem Delivered.

After the four-year stay at the Villa Medici in Rome, he worked for nine years at the Comédie-Française, first as factotum musical, later as musical director. He then held a chair in musical analysis at the Conservatoire de Paris. He also acted as a conferencier, conductor, improviser with the Ondes Martenot, pianist and music theorist and musical comedian, the latter with Jérôme Deschamps and Alain Germain.

For Germain he wrote the music for the play Un piano pour deux pianistes, in which he himself performed with Pascal Le Corre in 1987. In addition to some 150 film, television and dramatic music, Margoni composed a musical narrative about the discovery of America, an opera, an oratorio and numerous chamber music works.

Works 
 Après une lecture de Goldoni, Fantasy in 18th century style for bass trombone, tuba or saxhorn and piano, 1964
 Après une lecture d’Hoffmann, Improvisation for double bass and piano, 1967
 Après une lecture de Dreiser for bassoon and piano, 1969
 Quatre personnages de Calderon for guitar, 1972
 Cadence et danses for alto saxophone and piano, 1974
 Séquence pour un hymne à la nuit for cello and piano, 1979
 Dialogue, détente et stretto for trumpet or cornet and piano, 1980
 Trois eaux-fortes for viola and piano, 1982
 Danse ancienne (chaconne) et danse moderne for two harps
 Le Petit livre de Gargantua for tenor trombone and piano in three volumes, 1982
 Petit théâtre for oboe and piano, 1982
 Elégie for trombone and piano, 1983
 Sur un thème de John Bull for French horn and piano,
 Dix Études dans le style contemporain for clarinet, 1983
 Les Caractères, Variations for oboe and piano, 1984
 Variation et hommage for clarinet
 Pierrot ou les secrets de la nuit, Opera based on a libretto by Rémi Laureillard after Michel Tournier, 1990
 Premier Quatuor de saxophones, 1991
 L'Ile des Guanahanis, musical narration based on a libretto by Rémi Laureillard for one actor, choir and orchestra, 1992
 Promenades romaines for alto saxophone and piano, 1993–95
 L'Enfant des alpages, Oratorio for children's choir, instrumental ensemble and alpine horns, 1996
 Dix Études dans le style contemporain for Saxophone, 1999
 Sonate for baritone saxophone
 soundtrack to the three-part television film  by Hervé Baslé, 2001
 Quatre chants vénitiens for soprano, tenor saxophone and piano, 2001

External links 
 Alain Margoni on Musimen
 Dialogue autour d'Alain Margoni
 Discography (Discogs)
 Alain Margoni's concerto 1st mvt (youtube)

20th-century French composers
21st-century French composers
French classical composers
French male classical composers
French opera composers
Prix de Rome for composition
French film score composers
People from Seine-Saint-Denis
Living people
1934 births
Conservatoire de Paris alumni
Academic staff of the Conservatoire de Paris
20th-century French male musicians
21st-century French male musicians